A music group is a group of two or more musicians who perform instrumental or vocal music.

Music group or Music Group may also refer to:
 The Music Group, a former European musical instrument parent company
 Music Group (company), an audio and music products holding company
 Music organization
 Band (rock and pop)